David Glacier is the most imposing outlet glacier in Victoria Land, Antarctica.  It is named after the geologist Edgeworth David and is fed by two main flows which drain an area larger than 200,000 square kilometres of the East Antarctic plateau, with an estimated ice discharge rate of 7.8 +/- 0.7 km³/year. The northern flow drains from Talos Dome to the Ross Sea, but the main branch of the stream is fed by a network of tributaries which drain a common area of the inner plateau around Dome C and converge in a spectacular icefall normally known as the David Cauldron. The north wall of David Glacier, near its terminus at Cape Philippi, is named D'Urville Wall after Admiral Jules Dumont d'Urville.  As the David Glacier flows into the Ross Sea, it forms a floating mass known as the Drygalski Ice Tongue.

Hughes Bluff lies nearby.

See also
 List of glaciers in the Antarctic
 List of Antarctic ice streams
 Glaciology

References

Glaciers of Victoria Land
Ice streams of Antarctica